Microcystis is a genus of freshwater cyanobacteria that includes the harmful algal bloom-forming Microcystis aeruginosa. Many members of a Microcystis community can produce neurotoxins and hepatotoxins, such as microcystin and cyanopeptolin.  Communities are often a mix of toxin-producing and nonproducing isolates.

Etymology
The genus Microcystis derives from the Greek  mikros (small) + kystis (bladder)

Physical characteristics

As the etymological derivation implies, Microcystis is characterized by small cells (a few micrometers in diameter), possessing gas-filled vesicles (also lacking individual sheaths). The cells are usually organized into colonies (aggregations of which are visible with the naked eye) that begin in a spherical shape, losing coherence to become perforated or irregularly shaped over time. These colonies are bound by a thick mucilage composed of complex polysaccharide compounds, including xylose, mannose, glucose, fucose, galactose, and rhamnose, among other compounds.

The coloration of the protoplast is a light blue-green, appearing dark or brown due to optical effects of gas-filled vesicles.

Ecology

Microcystis is capable of producing large surface blooms through a combination of rapid division and buoyancy regulation by production of gas-filled  vesicles. In nature, Microcystis can exist as single cells or in large colonies containing many cells.  Their ability to regulate buoyancy is one of the keys to their dominance of eutrophic waters, by optimally positioning themselves within the photic zone in a stable water column.

Because they can form large surface blooms, they are thought to be able to outcompete other phytoplankton by monopolizing light in the photic zone.

Microcystis spp. are also capable of efficient uptake of phosphate and nitrogen; they are believed to be strongly influenced by nitrogen to phosphorus ratios (N:P ratio). Microcystis cells are also efficient at assimilating carbon from their environment; during large blooms, rampant photosynthesis can drive the pH of communities to < 9.0.   Recent efforts have suggested a combination of effective carbon-concentrating mechanisms and a potential ability to use urea as both a carbon and nitrogen source allows Microcystis to persist under these high-pH conditions.   

In South Africa, Hartebeestpoort Dam is highly impacted by Microcystis because of elevated phosphate and nitrate levels flowing from the sewers of Johannesburg, one of the few cities in the world that straddles a continental watershed divide, so lies upstream of major dams and rivers.

In North America, Microcystis blooms have caused issues in numerous freshwater systems over the last two decades. These include large lakes (Erie, Okeechobee) and small regional water masses like Ohio's Grand Lake St Marys.   In 2014, detection of the microcystin toxin in treated water of Toledo (OH) resulted in a shutdown of the water supply to more than 400,000 residents.  The breakthrough of the toxin in the system was linked to the presence of a virus that lysed cells and released the toxin out of particles into the dissolved phase.

Health risks
Cyanobacteria can produce neurotoxins and hepatotoxins, such as microcystin and cyanopeptolin.  Microcystis has also been reported to produce a compound (or compounds) that can have endocrine-disrupting effects.  In 2018, the Great Lakes Center for Fresh Waters and Human Health was founded at Bowling Green State University (OH) with a focus on problems associated with Microcystis blooms in the Laurentian Great Lakes. Under the leadership of inaugural director George S. Bullerjahn, the center engages scientists from nine institutions across six states, and is supported by combined funding from the National Science Foundation and National Institute of Environmental Health Sciences.

Species
Microcystis species include:

Microcystis aeruginosa
Microcystis argentea
Microcystis botrys
Microcystis elongata
Microcystis flos-aquae
Microcystis holsatica
Microcystis lutescens
Microcystis marina
Microcystis pallida
Microcystis panniformis
Microcystis salina
Microcystis thermalis
Microcystis viridis
Microcystis wesenbergii

See also 
Pandorina (Analogy)

References 

Chroococcales
Cyanobacteria genera